The John M. Annis House is an American registered historic building, located in North Royalton, Ohio.  It was listed in the U.S. National Register of Historic Places on March 19, 1992.

John McClintock Annis was born on February 26, 1804, in Phelps, New York, the son of Stephen and Christin Annis. Stephen (1776–1846) moved first to Phelps, New York before 1804, and then to Elyria, Ohio, where he raised his family.

John's lineage is: Stephen Annis (1776–1846), Thomas Annis (1750–1809), Daniel Annis (1711–1790), Abraham Annis (1668–1738) and Cormac Annis (1638–1717).

Historic uses 
 Single-family detached home

Notes 

1992 in the United States
Annis, John
Greek Revival houses in Ohio
Houses on the National Register of Historic Places in Ohio
National Register of Historic Places in Cuyahoga County, Ohio